Taherabad (also Romanized as Ţāherābād; also known as Ḩoseynābād) is a village in Gowdin Rural District, in the Central District of Kangavar County, Kermanshah Province, Iran. At the 2006 census, its population was 950, in 203 families.

References 

Populated places in Kangavar County